Iggy or Iggie is a unisex name and it is often a short form of the Roman Latin names Ignatia (feminine) and Ignatius (masculine), or their derivatives in other European languages. As such the name is derived ultimately from the Etruscan language family name Egnat, the meaning of which is unknown. (The Romans added the Latin nominative endings -ia and -ius.) A spelling with an initial "I" later became dominant, possibly because of a resemblance to the Latin word ignis "fire".

Iggy or Iggie may also refer to:

People 
 Iggy Pop, stage name of American punk rock singer and occasional actor James Newell Osterberg, Jr. (born 1947)
 Iggy Azalea, stage name of Australian rapper Amethyst Amelia Kelly (born 1990)
 Iggy Arroyo (1950–2012), Filipino politician
 Iggy Clarke (born 1952), Irish retired hurler
 Jarome Iginla (born 1977), Canadian National Hockey League player
 Ralph Ignatowski (1926–1945), U.S. Marine tortured and killed at the Battle of Iwo Jima
 Andre Iguodala (born 1984), American basketball player
 Michael Ignatieff, historian and Canadian politician
 Iggy Jones (c. 1927–1992), Gaelic footballer from Northern Ireland
 Iggy Katona (1916–2003), American stock car racer
 Iggy O'Donnell (1876–c. 1946), Australian rugby union player
 Iggy Shevak, American jazz musician from the 1930s to at least the '50s
 Marshall Shurnas (1922–2006), American football player nicknamed "Iggie"
 Iggy Strange Dahl, Swedish songwriter
 Iggie Wolfington (1919–2004), American stage actor
 "Iggy the Eskimo", a girlfriend or acquaintance of Syd Barrett
  Iggy Capra, (1991-present), American Artist and Painter

Fictional characters 
 Jim Ignatowski, from the TV series Taxi
 Iggy, one of the main characters from James Patterson's Maximum Ride book series
 Iggy (JoJo's Bizarre Adventure), from the Japanese manga JoJo's Bizarre Adventure
 Iggy Arbuckle, the title character of a Canadian animated TV series
 Iggy Koopa, one of the Koopalings in the Super Mario Bros. series
 Iggy, a friend of the comics character Little Lulu
 Iggy, from the anime Ergo Proxy
 Dr. Ignatius "Iggy" Frome, played by Tyler Labine in the show New Amsterdam (2018 TV series)
 Iggy Iguana, one of the main characters in the Canadian children's TV series Under the Umbrella Tree
 Iggy Catalpa, a recurring character from the animated show, Duckman

See also
 Iggy's Reckin' Balls, a game for the Nintendo 64

English masculine given names
English-language masculine given names
English unisex given names
Lists of people by nickname
Hypocorisms